Grrr Live! is a live album and concert film by the English rock band the Rolling Stones, released on 10 February 2023. It was recorded on 15 December 2012 at the Prudential Center in Newark, New Jersey as part of the band's 50 & Counting tour, in support of the GRRR! compilation released that year. It was originally broadcast as the pay-per-view 2012 concert film One More Shot: The Rolling Stones Live before being remixed and re-edited. The concert features guest appearances from Lady Gaga, John Mayer, Gary Clark Jr.. the Black Keys, Bruce Springsteen and former Stones guitarist Mick Taylor. Aside from its digital release, the album was released in four physical formats: 3×LP, 2×CD+Blu-ray, 2×CD+DVD and 2×CD.

Critical reception

Stephen Thomas Erlewine of AllMusic wrote that the "set list offers few surprises — if you don't recognize a song, that's because it's a new tune added to GRRR! — but the Stones are in fine form, never seeming tired of playing the hits in a fashion that guarantees a splendid time for one and all". Emma Harrison of Clash called the concert "one of the most memorable shows in the band's history" and the compilation "unequivocally delivers on the description that this body of work is their definitive Greatest Hits live collection". Reviewing the album for American Songwriter, Lee Zimmerman felt that there is "ample evidence of a band still in their provocative prime" and "the fact that the group still maintains the same verve and veracity so many years provides a testimony to both duration and durability".

Track listing

Charts

References

2023 live albums
2023 video albums
Mercury Records live albums
The Rolling Stones live albums